Monochroa scutatella is a moth of the family Gelechiidae. It was described by Johann Müller-Rutz in 1920. It is found in Switzerland and Italy.

References

Moths described in 1920
Monochroa